Jung Ryeo-won (born January 21, 1981) is a South Korean-born Australian actress. She began her entertainment career as a singer in the now-defunct girl group Chakra, and first rose to fame in the hit television series My Name Is Kim Sam-soon. She is also known for her roles in Two Faces of My Girlfriend, Castaway on the Moon, Wok of Love, and History of a Salaryman.

Early life 
The second of three children, Jung Ryeo-won was born in 1981, and emigrated to Brisbane, Australia in 1992 with her family. She encountered discrimination in grade school, which made her determined to become fluent in English. By junior high school, she had adapted to the Australian way of life. After attending MacGregor State High School, she graduated from Griffith University with a major in international business.

Career

2000–2006: Chakra
While she was an exchange student at Korea University from Griffith University in the 2000s, Jung was discovered on the streets of Apgujeong by Lee Sang-min, thereby changing her life and career path. She was placed in the K-pop girl group Chakra, along with Eeni, Eun and Hwangbo; their first album was released in 2000. Jung's morale was at a low in 2002, saying she sometimes felt alienated from her fellow Koreans, and was uncomfortable with the sexy clothes she was made to wear as a singer.

2006–2012: Transitioning to acting
Chakra disbanded in 2004, and Jung pursued acting full-time. After undergoing 11 unsuccessful auditions that year, she said she began doubting her decision to become an actress. In 2005, she gained recognition in the cult vampire sitcom Hello Franceska, then made her breakthrough in the romantic comedy My Name Is Kim Sam-soon. The series was a massive success with average ratings of over 37%, and 50.5% for the finale. Jung was praised for her portrayal of a fragile but good-natured character who fights for the hero's love, and eventually became one of the few successful singer-turned-actresses in the country.

Her follow-up series Autumn Shower received low ratings, but she rebounded with Which Star Are You From?, in which she played a country bumpkin living in the mountains of Gangwon Province. She was cast in her first movie leading role as a girl with multiple personality disorder in 2007's Two Faces of My Girlfriend, and though it was not a box office hit, she won Best New Actress at the Blue Dragon Film Awards.

As the titular character in 2009's Princess Jamyung, Jung starred in her first period drama. She then played a hikikomori in Castaway on the Moon, arguably her most notable film yet.

Both her 2011 big screen projects had elements of romance. She played a teacher in a small South Korean village who meets a North Korean officer in the war comedy/drama In Love and War, and in Kwak Kyung-taek's melodrama Pained, she played a hemophiliac who falls for her opposite, a man with analgesia, the inability to sense physical pain.

Jung began 2012 by starring as the heroine in quirky series History of a Salaryman. Playing one of the most unusual female characters in Korean drama history, she delivered a fun, no-holds-barred performance as a red-haired, constantly swearing, selfish, reckless rich snob, but injected heart and raw emotion into a character that could've otherwise been very unlikable. Critics and audiences were impressed with her performance, and her series nabbed the top spot on the Monday and Tuesday primetime ratings lineup while she later won a Top Excellence Award at the SBS Drama Awards.

She then starred in Never Ending Story, a romantic comedy about two people diagnosed with terminal illness who decide to spend their remaining time together preparing for death. In June 2012, Jung's contract with Won Entertainment expired and she signed with Bae Yong-joon's agency, KeyEast. Later that year, she played an idealistic screenwriter in The King of Dramas.

2013–2017: Acting setback
In January 2013, Jung unveiled her official website, through which she hopes to connect with her fans. Messages from the actress are uploaded in the "From rw" section. She then reunited with Pained costar Kwon Sang-woo in the medical drama Medical Top Team, playing a charismatic and ambitious thoracic surgeon.

Jung next played an impatient and careless radio producer in the cable series Bubble Gum in 2015; she and co-star Lee Dong-wook previously appeared together in the 2003 sitcom Do the Right Thing. In 2017, she starred in the legal procedural drama, Witch at Court, playing a highly ambitious prosecutor who speaks her mind and is known for her aggressive investigation tactics. For her portrayal, she received the Top Excellence Award at the 2017 KBS Drama Awards.

2018–present: Return to television and continued work
In 2018, Jung starred in the black comedy film Gate. She then starred in the SBS' gastronomy drama Wok of Love.

In 2019, Jung starred in the legal television series Prosecutor Civil War.

In September 2020, Jung's contract with KeyEast expired. She subsequently signed with H & Entertainment. In July 2022, Jung renewed her contract with H & Entertainment.

Other activities 
Jung published Ryeo-won's Sketchbook in 2007, which contained her drawings and writings about her Christian faith. Though she hasn't received formal instruction in fine arts, Jung likes to express herself through drawing in her spare time. Two of her artwork pieces were sold at a charity auction in 2012.

In March 2014, Jung began hosting Art Star Korea on cable channel StoryOn, an audition program/reality show featuring contemporary artists. She also participated in the program '살아보니 어때'.

On February 10, 2023, Jung donated 50 million won to help 2023 Turkey–Syria earthquake, by donating money through World Vision.

Filmography

Television series

Web series

Film

Music video

Discography

Book

Awards and nominations

References

External links

 
Jung Ryeo-won at KeyEast

1981 births
K-pop singers
Living people
South Korean female idols
South Korean women pop singers
People educated at MacGregor State High School
Griffith University alumni
Korea University alumni
South Korean film actresses
South Korean television actresses
Australian people of South Korean descent
21st-century South Korean singers
21st-century South Korean women singers